In Janetka v. Dabe, 892 F.2d 187 (2d Cir. 1989), the Second Circuit considered whether, under New York law, a plaintiff could satisfy the element of "favorable termination" requisite to a malicious prosecution claim when he had been acquitted on a misdemeanor charge (resisting arrest) but convicted of a less serious charge (disorderly conduct, a violation).

Background
In 1986, Andrew F. Janetka, Jr. was arrested by Darrell Dabe of the Suffolk County Police Department for resisting arrest. Janetka was found guilty of a lesser charge, disorderly conduct, and Dabe was reprimanded for how he documented the incident. Janetka later filed suit against the county under the concept of respondeat superior.
The court reiterated that, under New York law,
A "favorable termination"  is a termination indicating that the accused is not guilty.
When the termination is indecisive, the surrounding facts must be  examined  to determine "whether the failure to proceed implies a lack of  reasonable  grounds for the prosecution."

Holding

The court held that this acquittal constituted "favorable  termination".

Reasoning
1)  the multiple criminal charges were "distinct," i.e.
(a) their  elements are distinct,
(b) neither is a lesser included offense of the  other, and
(c) (most importantly) the underlying acts were committed  against different people (the disorderly conduct charge involved  Janetka's  actions directed at the unidentified Hispanic man; the resisting arrest  charge involved his actions directed at the officers' attempts to arrest him).

2) to  reject a malicious prosecution claim would be "particularly  inappropriate"  where the acquitted charge was the more serious one, because then police   officers could add unsupported, serious charges to legitimate, minor  ones with impunity.

Analysis
The holding of Janetka is overcome by arguing that all the charges for which plaintiff  was prosecuted stem from the same criminal activity and substantially overlap.

References

External links

United States Court of Appeals for the Second Circuit cases
1989 in United States case law
1989 in New York (state)
Suffolk County, New York